Sijing is a station on Shanghai Metro Line 9. It began operation on December 29, 2007. It is located in Sijing Town of Songjiang District.This station can transfer to the bus routes songjiang 45, songjiang 46, songjiang 46 local, songjiang 47, songjiang 48, songjiang 57(local name 松江45,松江46,松江46区间，松江47,松江48,松江57），191, and 191B.It has 2 places for entering and 2 places for exiting. South of the station is a bus station transferring to the routes 186 and huchen line (local name沪陈线）.

Railway stations in Shanghai
Shanghai Metro stations in Songjiang District
Railway stations in China opened in 2007
Line 9, Shanghai Metro